Maria Frances Parke (26 August 1772 – 31 July 1822) was an English soprano, pianist and composer of keyboard works.

Parke was born in London. Her father was the oboist John Parke, while her uncle was the oboist and composer William Thomas Parke.

She made her debut as a pianist and singer at the age of nine. At ten she performed a Clementi duet with Maria Hester Park née Reynolds (1760–1813), with whom she is sometimes confused.

In 1815 she married John Beardmore. She died in London in 1822.

Works
Selected works include:
A Divertimento and Military Rondo for the Piano
Grand Sonata in F Major for Solo Piano
Grand Sonata in E-flat Major for Solo Piano
Grand Sonata in D Major for Solo Piano

References

External links
 

1772 births
1822 deaths
18th-century British composers
18th-century classical composers
18th-century classical pianists
18th-century keyboardists
19th-century British composers
19th-century classical composers
19th-century classical pianists
19th-century keyboardists
Classical-period composers
English classical composers
English classical pianists
English women pianists
English sopranos
Women classical composers
Singers from London
Women classical pianists
19th-century women composers
18th-century women composers
18th-century English women
18th-century English people
19th-century English women
19th-century English people
19th-century women pianists